Sandra Andersson (born 31 December 1989) is a Swedish footballer midfielder who plays for Mallbackens IF.

External links 
 

1989 births
Living people
Swedish women's footballers
Mallbackens IF players
Damallsvenskan players
Women's association football midfielders